Mariane Fernándes (born 4 January 1996) is a Brazilian handball player for BM Bera Bera and the Brazilian national team.

She represented Brazil at the 2021 World Women's Handball Championship in Spain.

References

1996 births
Living people
Brazilian female handball players
Handball players at the 2014 Summer Youth Olympics
Expatriate handball players
Brazilian expatriate sportspeople in Spain
Sportspeople from Niterói
20th-century Brazilian women
21st-century Brazilian women